The Owl Creek Formation is a geologic formation ranging from Tennessee to Mississippi. It preserves fossils dating back to the Cretaceous period. Ornithomimids and ceratopsid remains are known from the formation. The ceratopsid tooth could represent a chasmosaurine.

See also
 List of fossiliferous stratigraphic units in Tennessee
 Paleontology in Tennessee

References

 

Cretaceous geology of Tennessee
Cretaceous Mississippi
Cretaceous Missouri